The Elaborate Entrance of Chad Deity is a dramatic comedy play by Kristoffer Diaz about a professional wrestler, "driven by narratives of the American dream and neoliberal capitalism."

Synopsis

Act One 
Macedonio Guerra is a professional wrestler at THE Wrestling. Despite being the superior wrestler Mace is delegated to playing the heel to the champion, Chad Deity. Everett K Olson, CEO of THE Wrestling, capitalizes on racial stereotypes to win support from the audience. Tired of being “the guy who loses to make the winners look good,'' Mace recruits Vigneshwar Paduar (VP) to THE Wrestling. Unable to fit the racially ambiguous VP into his show, Olson initially refuses. But with the help of Chad Deity, Olson brings VP on as The Fundamentalist, with Mace playing his partner, Che Chavez Castro. The pair, billed as anti-American extremists, quickly become fan favorite villains. Act One ends with The Fundamentalist calling out Chad Deity on stage.

Act Two 
THE Wrestling begins building a rivalry between Chad Deity and The Fundamentalist. Mace and VP begin working on a finisher for The Fundamentalist, settling on a superkick title the Sleeper Cell. After initially freezing, The Fundamentalist KOs Billy Heartland with a single kick. Next week he does the same move against Old Glory, becoming more arrogant with every win. Olson picks The Fundamentalist to become the next Champion but, to Mace’s dismay, VP decides to leave THE Wrestling. Needing Mace to step up in his place, Olson allows him to perform as himself.

Epilogue 
VP watches the fight from his home in bed. He is happy to see Macedonio Guerra on stage, not Che Chavez Castro. In the final moments of the play, Mace is powerbombed by Chad Deity. Prompting his girlfriend to ask “Why are they rooting for the bad guy?”

Production history
The Elaborate Entrance of Chad Deity had its world premier at Chicago's Biograph Theater on September 25, 2009 in a Victory Gardens Theater production starring Usman Ally (Vigneshwar Paduar), Kamal Angelo Bolden (Chad Deity), Desmin Borges (Macedonio Guerra), Jim Krag (Everett K. Olson), and Christian Litke (Billy Heartland, Old Glory).

Directed by Edward Torres, Designed by Brian Sidney Bembridge (scenery), Jesse Klug (lights), John Boesche (projections), and Christine Pascual (costumes)

Reception
Variety (magazine) published a positive review of the original production at the Biograph Theater, complimenting the "vigorous physicality and wickedly intelligent humor."  Critic Steve Oxman commented that "[Kristoffer] Diaz has found a vehicle to tell a much deeper narrative about how our culture digests racial identity, and how commerce, as well as commercial storytelling, is at its core about generating passion, with the exploitation of our baser instincts often the easiest means of doing so."

The New York Times said the production at the Off Broadway Second Stage Theatre "has the delicious crackle and pop of a galloping, honest-to-God, all-American satire."  The New York Daily News called the same production, "flashy, fleshy and ridiculously entertaining". The Los Angeles Times said the play "leaps out of the proscenium frame at every opportunity, exhorting, drop-kicking and body-slamming its way into an immediacy that is more familiar to sporting events and rap concerts than to a traditional night of theater."

Awards and nominations
 Winner 2008 National Latino Playwriting Award
 Finalist for the 2010 Pulitzer Prize for Drama.
 Winner 2011 Obie Award for Best New American Play. 
 New York Times Outstanding Playwright Award to Kristoffer Diaz (for Chad Deity) in 2011 
Henry Hewes Design Awards Nomination for Best Scenic Design Brian Sidney Bembridge
Henry Hewes Design Awards Nomination for Best Production Design Brian Sidney Bembridge, Jesse Klug, Christine Pasquale, Peter Nigrini, and Mikhail Fiksel   
Chicago Jeff Awards (2010) for Best New Work, Best Director, Best Actor and Best Fight Choreography

References

External links
 
 Reviews
 
 BrianSidneyBembridge.com

Off-Broadway plays
American plays
Obie Award-winning plays
2009 plays